Crno Brdo is a small village in the municipality of Pljevlja, Montenegro. The toponym means black hill.

Demographics
According to the 2003 census, the village had a population of  41 people.

According to the 2011 census, its population was 18.

References

Populated places in Pljevlja Municipality